Immanuel is a biblical character and Hebrew name.

Immanuel may refer to:

People
 Immanuel (name), a given name
 Immanuel the Roman (1261-1328)
 Immanuel Kant (1724–1804), German philosopher
 Immanuel Wallerstein, social scientist
 Stella Immanuel, Cameroonian physician, author, and pastor

Places
 Camp Immanuel, an army base in Kiryat Malakhi, Israel
 Immanuel (town), an Israeli settlement in the West Bank

Arts
 Immanuel (film), a 2013 Malayalam drama film by Lal Jose
 Immanu El, a Swedish post-rock band

See also
 Emanuel (disambiguation) 
 Emmanuel (disambiguation)